Williamsonia may refer to:
 Williamsonia, a genus of dragonflies also known as boghaunters
 Williamsonia (plant), an extinct genus of plants in the family Williamsoniaceae